Old Kincardine Castle was a 13th-century castle near Auchterarder in Perth and Kinross, Scotland. The castle was located on a promontory overlooking the glen. Sir David de Graham of Cardross received the lands of Kincardine from the Earl of Strathearn and started construction of the castle shortly afterwards. It formed a quadrangle, surrounded by a moat.

Queen Mary of Scotland stayed at Kincardine on a journey during 1562. In 1579, John Stewart, 4th Earl of Atholl, Chancellor of Scotland, stayed at Kincardine on his way from Stirling, whereupon he suddenly took ill and died at the castle. The castle held out for ten days under artillery fire from the forces of John Middleton, during the Wars of the Three Kingdoms, until the well failed, forcing the garrison to surrender. The castle was dismantled by the Archibald Campbell, 1st Marquess of Argyll in 1645. Only small fragments remain.  In 1660, its stones were used to build a new local church in Auchterarder. The new Kincardine Castle was built nearby in the 19th century by James Johnston.

References
Reid, Alexander George. Annals of Auchterarder and Memorials of Srathearn-The Castle of Kincardine in Srathearn  (1899).

Ruined castles in Perth and Kinross
Clan Graham